The 2012 Cincinnati Commandos season was the 3rd season for the franchise, and their first as a member of the Northern Conference of the United Indoor Football League (UIFL). 

Just one month after their 2011 CIFL Championship Game victory, the Commandos announced they were leaving the Continental Indoor Football League (CIFL) to join the UIFL. On August 23, 2011, it was announced that Bill Back would return as head coach for a 3rd season with the Commandos

The Commandos finished the regular season 8-2 (7-2 in the Northern Conference), clinching the first round by with the top spot in the Northern Conference. The Commandos advanced to Ultimate Bowl II with a 60-42 victory over the Erie Explosion. The Commandos defeated the Florida Tarpons, 62-44 clinching their third consecutive championship.

Schedule
Key:

Regular season

Postseason

Standings

y - clinched conference title

x - clinched playoff spot

Roster

Staff

References

Cincinnati Commandos
Cincinnati Commandos
American football in Ohio